Tephris nigrisparsella is a species of moth in the family Pyralidae. It was described by Ragonot in 1887. It is found in Russia and Kazakhstan.

References

Moths described in 1887
Phycitini
Moths of Asia